A Winter of Cyclists is a 2013 documentary film by Mike Prendergast. The film chronicles a group of Colorado participants as they attempt to complete a 52-day winter bicycle commuting challenge created by Scot Stucky.

The challenge, known as "The Icy Bike Winter Commuting Challenge", was created to encourage people to cycle to work from October to March, during the darker, colder and the snowier months of the year.

The film captures the wide diversity in which riders adapt to new commuting logistics, adverse weather conditions and riding in the dark. And when the Colorado riders encounter an unexpected solidarity across the American continent and into Europe via Facebook, the film provides glimpses into a broader global winter cycling community that is just becoming aware of each other. Facebook Group members encourage each other, share weather reports, gear tips, and inspirational and touching personal stories. The film concludes with the results of the challenge and the riders reflection on their winter of cycling.

References

 Daily Camera Article on A Winter of Cyclists
 Denver Post Winter Riding Tips

External links 
  - 
 

2013 films
Documentary films about cycling
Utility cycling
2013 documentary films
American sports documentary films
Films shot in Colorado
Films set in Colorado
Cycling in Colorado
2010s English-language films
2010s American films
English-language documentary films